The Unquiet Grave is an anthology of fantasy and horror stories edited by American writer August Derleth.  It was first published by Four Square Books in 1964.  The anthology contains 15 stories from Derleth's earlier anthology The Sleeping and the Dead.  Many of the stories had originally appeared in the magazines Weird Tales, Esquire and Black Mask.

Contents

 "The Shadows", by Henry S. Whitehead
 "Carnaby’s Fish", by Carl Jacobi
 "The Painted Mirror", by Donald Wandrei
 "The Double Shadow", by Clark Ashton Smith
 "One Way to Mars", by Robert Bloch
 "Out of the Picture", by Arthur Machen
 "The Canal", by Everil Worrell
 "Deaf, Dumb, and Blind", by C. M. Eddy, Jr.
 "Spider Bite", by Robert S. Carr
 "Brenner’s Boy", by John Metcalfe
 "Mr. Lupescu", by Anthony Boucher
 "Seventh Sister", by Mary Elizabeth Counselman
 "In Amundsen’s Tent", by John Martin Leahy
 "Man in a Hurry", by Alan Nelson
 "The Last Pin", by H. W. Guernsey

Sources

1964 anthologies
Fantasy anthologies
Horror anthologies